was a  after Ōnin and before Chōkyō. This period spanned from April 1469 through July 1487.

Change of era
 1469 : The era name was changed to mark an event or a number of events. The old era ended and a new one commenced in Ōnin 3.

Events of the Bunmei era
 1468 (Bunmei 2, 7th month): Ichijō Kanera (1402–1481) was relieved of his duties as kampaku.
 January 18, 1471 (Bunmei 2, 27th day of the 12th month ): The former Emperor Go-Hanazono died at age 52.
 April 16, 1473 (Bunmei 5, on the 19th day of the 3rd month):  Yamana Sōzen died at age 70.
 1478 (Bunmei 10):  Ichijō Kanera  published Bunmei ittō-ki (On the Unity of Knowledge and Culture) which deals with political ethics and six points about the duties of a prince.
 February 21, 1482 (Bunmei 14, 4th day of the 2nd month): Construction of Ashikaga Yoshimasa's Silver Pavilion commenced.

Notes

References
 Nussbaum, Louis Frédéric and Käthe Roth. (2005). Japan Encyclopedia. Cambridge: Harvard University Press. ; OCLC 48943301
 Keene, Donald. (2003). Yoshimasa and the Silver Pavilion: The Creation of the Soul of Japan. New York: Columbia University Press. ; OCLC 52268947
 Titsingh, Isaac. (1834). Nihon Ōdai Ichiran; ou,  Annales des empereurs du Japon.  Paris: Royal Asiatic Society, Oriental Translation Fund of Great Britain and Ireland. OCLC 5850691

External links
 National Diet Library, "The Japanese Calendar" -- historical overview plus illustrative images from library's collection

Japanese eras
1460s in Japan
1470s in Japan
1480s in Japan